Moskovsky District may refer to:
Maskowski District (Moskovsky District), a city district of Minsk, Belarus
Moskva District, Kyrgyzstan (Moskovsky District), a district of Chuy Region, Kyrgyzstan
Moskovsky District, Russia, several districts and city districts in Russia
Moskovsky District, name of Hamadoni District, Tajikistan, in 1950–2004
Moskovskyi District, name of Saltivskyi District, Kharkiv, Ukraine, in 1961–2022
Moskovskyi District, a former district of Kyiv, Ukraine, before 2001

District name disambiguation pages